Maristella de Panizza Lorch is one of the leading post-war critics of Italian literature working in America.  She is affiliated with Columbia University.  She is also author of the novel Mamma in Her Village. She is the founder and Director Emerita of the Italian Academy for Advanced Studies in America at Columbia University, a multi-disciplinary research and international scholarly exchange institute.

References

External links
Short biography on Maristella Lorch

Living people
Year of birth missing (living people)
Columbia University people